This is a list of events held and scheduled by Strikeforce, a mixed martial arts organization based in the United States. The first event, Strikeforce: Shamrock vs. Gracie, took place on March 10, 2006.

Events

Event locations 
Total event number: 63

These cities have hosted the following numbers of Strikeforce events as of Strikeforce: Marquardt vs. Saffiedine:

 United States (63)
 San Jose, California – 19
 Fresno, California – 5
 Las Vegas, Nevada - 5
 San Diego, California – 3
 St. Louis, Missouri – 3
 Beverly Hills, California – 2
 Hoffman Estates, Illinois – 2
 Columbus, Ohio – 2
 Portland, Oregon – 2
 Nashville, Tennessee – 2
 Kent, Washington – 2
 Oklahoma City, Oklahoma - 1
 Phoenix, Arizona – 1
 Los Angeles, California – 1
 Stockton, California – 1
 Broomfield, Colorado – 1
 Sunrise, Florida – 1
 Kansas City, Kansas – 1
 Jackson, Mississippi – 1
 East Rutherford, New Jersey – 1
 Cincinnati, Ohio – 1
 Bixby, Oklahoma – 1
 Cedar Park, Texas – 1
 Dallas, Texas – 1
 Houston, Texas – 1
 Everett, Washington – 1
 Tacoma, Washington – 1

See also 
List of Strikeforce champions
List of Bellator MMA events
List of DREAM events
List of EliteXC events
List of Invicta FC events
List of ONE Championship events
List of Pancrase events
List of Pride FC events
List of PFL/WSOF events
List of Shooto Events
List of UFC events
List of WEC events

References 

Strikeforce